Nomeda Kazlaus (born as Nomeda Kazlauskaitė in Vilnius, Lithuania) is one of the most outstanding Lithuanian operatic sopranos of the contemporary generation of singers, an international opera diva who has appeared in leading roles in many European opera houses including the Gran Teatre del Liceu in Barcelona, the Mariinsky Theatre in Saint Petersburg, the Bolshoi Theatre in Moscow, the Teatro Malibran in Venice etc. Nomeda Kazlaus is also TV host, producer, vocal professor, jury chair and member of many international competitions, laureate of four international singing competitions, winner of the Lithuanian Ministry of Culture Young Artist 2007 award.

Biography 
Born in Vilnius, Lithuania, on 13 February Kazlaus is as frequent a guest on some of the most prestigious European theatre and concert stages, international festivals as she stars in international productions at such venues as the St. John's Smith Square in London, the Grand Hall of the Kremlin’s Gostiny Dvor in Moscow, Castel de Perelada in Spain, Moscow Tchaikovsky Concert Hall and Conservatoire Tchaikovsky Grand Hall, etc.

She is giving guest appearances and  leading role performances at Gran Teatre del Liceu, Barcelona; Moscow’s Bolshoi Theater; Teatro Alighieri, Ravena; Malibran Theater, Venice; Mariinsky Theater, St. Petersburg; Pergola Opera Festival, Wroclaw; Cankarjev Dom in Ljubljana, Slovenia; Kazan Opera and Ballet Theatre, Russia; Lithuanian National Opera Theatre, Wroclaw Philharmonics, Poland; Lithuanian National Philharmonic etc.

She has been performing along a 20th-century opera legend Montserrat Caballe since 2000 (only one Lithuanian singer singing leading roles with M.Caballe).

Her operatic repertoire comprises title roles ranging from Wagner’s Isolde and Brunhilde to Verdi’s Elisabetta and Beethoven’s Leonore.

Nomeda Kazlaus is author and host of the ‚Skambantys pasauliai su Nomeda Kazlaus’ (The Ringing Worlds with Nomeda Kazlaus) TV talk show series at the Lithuanian National TV where she interviews world-famous music and culture personalities like Montserrat Caballe (soprano, Spain), Andrea Bocelli (tenor, Italy), Placido Domingo (tenor, Spain), Christoph Eschenbach (conductor, pianist), Sarah Brightman (soprano), Dmitri Hvorostovsky (baritone), Jean Michel Jarre (France), John Fisher (conductor, Metropolitan Opera Director), Sasha Walz (choreographer), Erwin Schrott (baritone), Jostein Gaarder (writer), Erwin Wurm (artist), Krzysztof Zanussi (film director), Krzysztof Penderecki (composer, conductor), Charles Castronovo (tenor), Alexander Markov (violinist), Jelena Bashkirova (pianist), Ruta Lee (actress), Constantine Orbelian (pianist, conductor), Lawrence Brownlee (tenor), Ivan Monighetti (cellist), Montserrat Marti (soprano), Eimuntas Nekrošius (stage director, Lithuania), Andrei Makarevich (singer) etc.

In 2019 her TV Talk Show Skambantys pasauliai su Nomeda Kazlaus (The Ringing Worlds with Nomeda Kazlaus) won the name of the best TV Talk Show in 2018 in Lithuania (Lithuanian Radio and Television Commission Competition LRTK “Pragiedruliai”). 

N.Kazlaus is a chair and member of J.Sibelius vocal competition JSFest in Finland (2017, 2018, 2019), a chair and member of Eurovision National Jury in Lithuania (2016, 2017);  a chair of Lithuanian national singers‘ competition named after V. Jonuskaite-Zauniene; a chair of ‚Music Talent League’ (2016); jury member of the ‚Golden Voice‘ (‚Auksinis balsas‘) television project of the Lithuanian National TV (2013, 2014, 2016), jury member of Eurovision Song National Contest in Lithuania and jury chair person of the Lithuanian Jury of the Eurovision Song Contest 2016 (https://eurovisionworld.com/esc/eurovision-2016-jury-members).

Nomeda Kazlaus is a Founder and Artistic Director of the international annual vocal and stage acting masterclasses in Lithuania 'Nomeda Kazlaus Summer Academy of Vocal and Acting Techniques' ("Nomedos Kazlaus vokalo ir aktorinio meistriškumo vasaros akademija"), this project started in 2015 as ’Palanga Summer Academy’ (’Palangos vasaros akademija’).

In 2018 Lithuanian National TV released a Documentary Film The Singing Summer about her summer academy, director - Rimantas Babrauskas (2018 m. LRT dokumentinė apybraiža "Dainuojanti vasara" apie vasaros akademiją). 

The Singing Summer documentary provides an artful insight into the annual education project known as Nomeda Kazlaus's Summer Academy of Vocal Arts, its artistic, creative, and inter-human atmosphere. It looks into various vocal techniques, interpretations, the importance of proper breathing and psychological stamina -- all explored against the backdrop of the serene Palanga seaside resort in Lithuania whose pristine natural beauty is something all academy participants blend with. (Dokumentinėje apybraižoje „Dainuojanti vasara“ meniškai ir dokumentaliai atskleidžiama kasmetinio edukacinio projekto „Nomedos Kazlaus vokalo ir aktorinio meistriškumo vasaros akademija“ Palangoje, meninė ir kūrybine bei bendražmogiška atmosfera, dainavimo technikos ir interpretacijos, kvėpavimo bei atlikėjo psichologiniai štrichai, įstabus Palangos pajūrio ir gamtos grožis, su kuriuo ir susitapatina vasaros akademijos dakyviai bei absolventai.)

Kazlaus is author of singing master classes at the Lithuanian Music and Theater Academy (2014).

Her leading roles repertoire includes:
Isolde in Wagner’s Tristan und Isolde (Lithuanian National Philharmonic); 
Brunnhilde in Wagner’s Die Walkure (First Lithuanian Brunnhilde, 20 premières - Teatro Alighieri, Ravenna, Italy; Cankarjev Dom, Ljubljana, Slovenia; Lithuanian National Opera Theatre); 
Leonore in L.van Beethoven’s Fidelio (Lithuanian National Opera Theatre); Elisabetta in Don Carlo (Mariinsky Theatre in St. Petersburg, Russia); 
Anne Boleyn in Henry VII by C.Saint-Saens (sang with Montserrat Caballe and Simon Estes, Grand Teatre del Liceu, Barcelona, Spain); 
Desdemona in Otello (sang with Ian Storey, Pergola Opera Festival, Wroclaw, Poland); 
Sieglinde (cover) in Die Walkure (conductor Valery Gergiev, Bolshoi Theatre, Moscow, Russia); 
Ortlinde in Die Walkure (conductor Valery Gergiev, Bolshoi Theatre, Moscow, Russia); 
Marina Mnishek in Boris Godunov (Kazan Opera and Ballet Theatre, Russia); 
Carmen in Carmen (Kosice Opera Theatre, Slovakia); 
Eboli in Don Carlo (Lithuanian Lithuanian National Opera Theatre); 
Preziosilla in La Forza del Destino (First Lithuanian Preziosilla, sang with Sergej Larin, Lithuanian National  Philharmonic) etc.

Conductors she has worked with include Lord Yehudi Menuhin, Valery Gergiev, Constantine Orbelian, Vladimir Fedoseev, Saulius Sondeckis, José Collado, Anton Guadagno, Tugan Sokhiev, Jacek Kaspszyk, Alexander Sladkovski, Roberto Paternostro, Mikhail Sinkevich, Walter Attanasi, Miquel Ortega, Ewa Michnik, Modestas Pitrėnas, Juozas Domarkas, Robertas Servenikas, Martynas Staskus, Vytautas Lukocius,  etc.

Soloists she has performed with include Montserrat Caballe, Simon Estes, Ian Storey, Carlos Alvarez, Vasilij Gerello, Montserrat Marti, Vittorio Vitelli, Stefano Palatchi, John Keyes, Hector Sandoval, Alexander Markov, Oscar Marin, Louis Manikas, Sergejs Jegers, Olga Savova etc.

International reviewers (Opera News, Opera Now) describe the singer as being gifted with an impressive and powerful voice of rich and vibrant color, vast range, exceptional musicality, perfect pitch on every register, emotional precision, enchanting acting and personal charm.

The Beginning. Some important information.
Kazlaus studied piano and musicology at the National M. K. Čiurlionis School of Art in Vilnius from the age of 6 and continued to the Lithuanian Academy of Music and Theatre, where she graduated with an arts licentiate degree. A professional pianist, Nomeda altered her musical career early in her studies to become an opera singer. Starting as a high dramatic mezzo-soprano, her professional debut was in the title role of Bizet's Carmen, followed by roles of Eboli in Don Carlos, Prezziosilla in La forza del destino, and others. Her current repertoire includes Brünnhilde and Sieglinde in Die Walküre, Elisabetta in Don Carlo, Desdemona in Otello and other roles in the dramatic soprano range.

Kazlaus' biggest breakthrough came in Andorra in 2000, during the master classes given by Spanish soprano Montserrat Caballé. Having witnessed her performance, Caballe greeted and complimented her: "We have a diva, a wonderful voice". The encounter led to an artistic collaboration between them, glimpses of which are featured in the documentary Caballe, Beyond Music (Morena Films, 2003) and in Montserrat Caballé 40 anys al Liceu (Fundacio Gran Teatre del Liceu, 2002). She was also a main guest at the Montserrat Caballé prasentiert Stars von Morgen (Franco-German ARTE TV) in 2001. A series of joint concerts soon followed, culminating in a Pierre Jourdan production of Henry VIII by Camille Saint-Saëns, featuring Montserrat Caballé as Catherine of Aragon, Simon Estes as Henry VIII and Nomeda Kazlaus as Anne Boleyn, conductor Jose Collado at the Grand Teatre del Liceu, Barcelona.

With an intimate insight into professional secrets of such operatic legends as Montserrat Caballe under her belt, Kazlaus has also gained a substantial extra experience at a number of international vocal master classes with Montserrat Caballé, Anatolij Goussev, Ernst Haefliger, Francisco Araiza, Julia Hamari, Thomas Hemsley, Louis Manikas, and others. She has worked with theatre directors Pierre Jourdan, Eimuntas Nekrošius, Michal Znaniecki, Jurij Aleksandrov and others.

Kazlaus received the Richard-Wagner-Verband Bayreuth Grant (Germany) for dramatic soprano singers in 2003. 

She has performed in leading roles and gala concerts at the Ravenna Festival in Italy, the Peralada Festival in Spain, Moscow Spring in Russia, Pergola Opera Festival in Wroclaw (Poland), Usedom (Germany) and other international festivals.

She has performed at St. John's, Smith Square in London, the Grand Hall of the Moscow Gostiny Dvor (with Montserrat Caballé, on the occasion of the inauguration of the hall), the Moscow Conservatory Tchaikovsky Grand Hall, the Moscow Philharmonic Grand Hall, the Wroclaw Philharmonic Hall (Poland), the Cankar Hall in Ljubljana (Slovenia), and at other international venues.

Kazlaus sang the role of Brünnhilde in more than 20 international performances of Richard Wagner's Die Walküre between August 2007 and April 2008.

In 2009, she released her solo album The Art of Dramatic Soprano with Lithuanian National Symphony Orchestra, conductor Modestas Pitrėnas.

In May 2010, Nomeda Kazlaus facilitated the arrival of Montserrat Caballé in Vilnius, where they gave a joint gala concert  at the Lithuanian National Opera and Ballet Theatre to celebrate the tenth anniversary of their collaboration.

In 2013 she sang soprano part in "Polish Requeim" by Krzysztof Penderecki in Wroclaw Philharmonic Hall, Poland, 2013. 05. 24 and in Vilnius Festival, Lithuania, 2013.06.14 - the first performance of "Polish Requiem" in Lithuania on the occasion of 80 years anniversary of K.Penderecki and commemoration of the 20th anniversary of the re-establishment of diplomatic relations between Lithuania and Poland, soloists Nomeda Kazlaus (soprano, Lithuania), Agnieszka Rehlis (mezzosoprano, Poland), Adam Zdunikowski (tenor, Poland), Liudas Mikalauskas (bass, Lithuania). Conductor - Jacek Kaspszyk (Poland, England); Wroclaw Philharmonic Symphony Orchestra, Kaunas State Choir (conductor - Petras Bingelis), State Choir "Vilnius" group of men (conductor - Povilas Gylys) at the Lithuanian National Opera and Ballet Theatre. Read more: Vilnius Festival 2013: Seven plus one for the 17th year, Gedulo ir vilties dieną skambės K. Pendereckio „Lenkiškasis Requiem“, Penderecki w Wilnie etc.

Nomeda Kazlaus (Reviews) as Brunnhilde in Wagner’s Die Walkure at the International Ravenna Festival, Italy, 2007; Ljublijana Festival, Slovenia, 2007; Lithuanian National Opera theatre, 2007 Nomeda Kazlaus as Brunnhilde in Wagner’s Die Walkure at the International Ravenna Festival, Italy, 2007; Ljublijana Festival, Slovenia, 2007; Lithuanian National Opera theatre, 2007, reviews

‘Striking and thought-provoking visually, with well-paced and involving direction and a largely homegrown cast, this staging benefited enormously from an outstanding Brunnhilde - Nomeda  Kazlaus, who brought an impressive and powerful soprano voice to bear on this most demanding role, while at the same time, a genuine poignancy to her acting, especially in the great Act III duet with Wotan. She was always dead center on pitch, even in her exultant battlecry, and her nascent eroticism made one wish to see her future encounter with Siegfried. It was a truly sensuous performance.’
Brendan G. Carroll, Opera Now, July/August 2007, England, after Die Walkure at the Lithuanian National Opera Theatre

‘The soprano Nomeda Kazlaus was especially outstanding with her more than usually human and subtly feminine interpretation of the Brunhilde character, in which she skillfully found enough space to also show the belligerent side of her, not withholding any of the obligatory pinnacles associated with the role.’
Giulia Vannoni, La Voce, July 2007, Italy, after Die Walkure at the Teatro Alighieri during the Ravenna annual festival

‘Nomeda Kazlaus skillfully interprets Brunnhilde; she embellishes the character with her voice, beauty and powerful vitality, while being utmost delicate in conveying all its motherly and daughterly fondness.’
Stefania Bevilacqua, www.ateatro.it, (108) 16/05/2007, Italy, after Die Walkure at the Lithuanian National Opera Theatre

‘However, it was the local artist, Nomeda Kazlaus, who shined through above all the international cast as Brunnhilde.’
Dmitri Morozov, The Culture, April 5–11, 2007 edition, after Die Walkure at the Lithuanian National Opera Theatre, Russia

‘Nomeda Kazlaus successfully tamed the very demanding role of Brunhilde and her performance was one of grandeur.’
‘A Lecture from Lithuania’ by Gregor Pom, The Pop/Kultura, July 13, 2007, Slovenia, after Die Walkure at the Ljublijana Festival

‘In our opinion, the first Lithuanian Brunhilde, embodied by Nomeda Kazlaus, is a stunning match of the director’s creative vision. The obvious bond between him and the singer as well as the sensitive nature of Nomeda enabled her to create a quality portrait of motherly and daughterly kindness both vocally and artistically.’
Ido Baldasso/Stefania Bevilacqua, The Muzikos Barai, June 13, 2007, Lithuania

‘The impressive debut of Nomeda Kazlaus in the role of Brunnhilde which she appeared in at all five performances calls for an acclaim. Having lived the music of Wagner‘s on the grand stages of Moscow and St.Petersburgh, this solo performer charmed with beautifully polished voice, vibrant with equally qualitative sound in all registers. She also excelled in the interpretation of the character.’
Beata Baublinskiene, The Bravissimo, April 2007, Lithuania

‘With the appearance of Brunnhilde created by Nomeda Kazlaus in the 2nd act one finally witnesses the voice of the genuine Nibelungenlied calibre.’
Renata Baltrusyte, The Face, March 22, 2007, Lithuania

‘The distinctly accurate singing and stage stamina of Nomeda Kazlaus were a delightful surprise for the audience of the Lithuanian National Opera & Ballet Theatre.’
Asta Andrikonyte, The Lithuanian Morning, March 20, 2007, Lithuania

‘It compels me to laud those who assembled the set of soloists of such resounding qualities as the powerful and convincingly dramatic soprano Nomeda Kazlaus (Brunnhilde).’
Rasa Gecaite, The Atgimimas, March 23, 2007, Lithuania

‘The role of Brunnhilde was tamed by Nomeda Kazlaus. <...> The young singer impressed with a very fit shape and culture of her voice as well as consistent and precise acting technique. She displayed a very clear inner vision of the role she was in, strived to reveal the full range of vocal drama. Her most successful and convincing moments both vocally and in terms of theatrical expression were the episode with Siegmund in the 2nd and the finale of the 3rd acts.’
Jurate Katinaite, The Literature & Art, March 23, 2007, Lithuania

‘Nomeda Kazlaus who interprets the role of Brunnhilde owns a remarkably stylish singing manner underlined with perfect articulation.’ Sarunas Nakas, The Guilds Of Culture, March 2007, Lithuania

‘The last act of the opera awards with exceptionally impressive duos of Wotan and his Valkyrie daughter Brunnhilde by Nomeda Kazlaus.’ Joana Giedraityte, The Time, March 16, 2007, Lithuania

‘Nominated for the Golden Stage Cross national award in the category of the Young Artist for the exceptionally startling debut in the role of Brunnhilde in R.Wagner‘s Die Walkure.’ The Bravissimo, April 2007, Lithuania

Nomeda Kazlaus (Reviews) as Desdemona in Verdi’s Otello at the International Pergola Opera Festival in Wroclaw, Poland, 2008, reviews

'The famous Lithuania-born opera singer Nomeda Kazlaus was invited to breathe the life of her own into the role of the black vice gerent’s wife. Armed with her lush soprano voice, often pierced with dramatic flares, the singer made a riveting reading into the soul of the kind-hearted Desdemona. One could hear the unconditional artistic devotion, awash with sincerity in the 3rd act during the sad willow ballad Dio ti Giocondi, as well as during the final prayer Era Piu Calmo, Ave Maria. The work she has done calls for acclamation befitting a true diva.' ‘Othello Abandons Cyprus for the Island of Piasek’ by Wilfried Gorny, www.maestro.net.pl, June 19, 2008

'The production was blessed with a wonderful cast of singers, especially the outstanding Lithuanian Nomeda Kazlaus, the owner of the powerful soprano rich in colour and depth.' ‘The Drama of Envy Unfolds in Freezing Cold’ by Bronislaw Tumilowicz, 
the Przegląd Nr. 26, June 29, 2008

'A truly moving Desdemona was brought to life by Nomeda Kazlaus from Lithuania.' ‘Othello on the Water – press reviews about the first night of the opera’ by Adam Domagala, the Gazeta Wyborcza, June 16, 2008

'A big surprise of this international production was soprano Nomeda Kazlaus who created the role of Desdemona <…>. The suspense she generated grew as the opera progressed and became palpable in the final act when Kazlaus revealed her vocal and artistic prowess in the impressive incarnation of the prayer and subsequent death in the arms of her beloved." ‘Verdi’s Chamber Othello in Wroclaw’ by Magdalena Talik, www.kulturaonline.pl, June 16, 2008

'The Lithuanian soprano Nomeda Kazlaus convinced beyond doubt of the legitimacy of her concept of Desdemona. Hers was the powerful and valorous Desdemona, but also the one that graciously gives in to the force of destiny in the name of love.'
‘The Death Creep’s in on a Freezing Night of Opera’ by Jacek Marczynski, the Rzeczpospolita, June 16, 2008

'Nomeda Kazlaus as Desdemona truly walks in her character’s shoes <…> the stunning scene where she sings of the willow, then the heartrending prayer in the final act hypnotized with sheer beauty and warmth of emotion.' ‘The Drama of Passion’ by Magdalena Talik, the Polska Gazeta Wroclawska, June 16, 2008

'Lithuanian soprano Nomeda Kazlaus (Desdemona) is yet another success of this production. She skillfully integrated and conveyed kindness and honesty on the one hand as well as resolve and devotion on the other, in other words, all the kernel features of Desdemona’s character.' Izabelka Oleksik, the Dziennik Teatralny Kraków, June 18, 2008

Operatic repertoire 

Verdi
 Un ballo in maschera Amelia
 Don Carlo Elisabetta
 Otello Desdemona
 Il trovatore Leonora
 Aida Aida
 La forza del destino Leonora
 Nabucco Abigaille
 Macbeth Lady Macbeth
 Attila Odabella
 A.Ponchielli La Gioconda La Gioconda

Puccini
 Tosca Floria Tosca
 Manon Lescaut Manon Lescaut
 Turandot Turandot
 Giordano Andrea Chénier Maddalena di Coigny
 Mascagni Cavalleria rusticana Santuzza

Wagner 
 Die Walküre Brünnhilde, Sieglinde
 Siegfried Brünnhilde
 Parsifal Kundry
 Tannhäuser Elisabeth, Venus
 Lohengrin Elsa
 Der fliegende Holländer Senta
 Tristan und Isolde Isolde

Strauss
 Ariadne auf Naxos Ariadne, Primadonna
 Elektra Chrysothemis
 Rosenkavalier Die Feldmarschallin
 Salome Salome
 Beethoven Fidelio Leonore
 Massnet Le Cid Chimene
 Saint-Saëns Henry VIII Anne Boleyn
 Bizet Carmen Carmen

Tchaikovsky
 The Queen of Spades Lisa
 Eugene Onegin Tatjana
 Shostakovich Lady Macbeth of the Mtsensk District Katerina Izmailova
 Janáček Káťa Kabanová Káťa Kabanová
 Berg Wozzeck Marie
 Menotti The Consul Magda

Concert repertoire 

 Verdi Requiem
 Penderecki Polish Requiem
 Beethoven Symphony No. 9
 Strauss Vier Letzte Lieder
 Wagner Wesendonck Lieder
 Bruckner Te Deum
 Bruckner Mass No. 3 in F-minor
 Mahler Symphony No. 2

Discography 
The Singing Summer (documentary film, 2018, Lithuanian National TV)
The Art of Dramatic Soprano (Music Mills CD release 2009)
Schubert's Mass in C-major Nr. 4, conducted by Yehudi Menuhin (live recording, Warner Classics CD release 2003)
Recordationes de Christo moriendo by Paweł Łukaszewski (live recording, PRCD-003, Prior Musica/Prior Records CD release 2002)

References 

Herrscher, Roberto In review: Barcelona, Opera News, May 2002
Bevilacqua, di Stefania Die Walküre di Richard Wagner con la regia di di Eimuntas Nekrošius, Ateatro, April 2007 
Gorny, Wilfried Otello - zamiast na Cypr dopłynął na wyspę Piasek, Maestro, June 2008 
Pomerantzev, Igor Поверх барьеров с Игорем Померанцевым, Radio Svoboda (Radio Free Europe/Radio Liberty), August 2009 
Who is Who in Lithuania 2009 
Armonaitė, Liucija Auksu spindi pirmasis Nomedos Kazlauskaitės-Kazlaus albumas, Muzikos barai, June 2009 
Klusas, Mindaugas Svajonės keliu - į soprano viršukalnes, kulturpolis.lt, April 2009 
Augulytė, Milda Spanish opera star M.Caballe will be applauded by invited audience of Vilnius, Kamanė, May 2010
Antanaitis, Audrys "Avilys" - Pokalbis su dainininke Nomeda Kazlauskaite Kazlaus, Žinių radijas, May 2010

External links 
 
Wagner Society of Dallas, Nomeda Kazlaus

Living people
1974 births
Lithuanian operatic sopranos
Lithuanian Academy of Music and Theatre alumni
20th-century Lithuanian women singers
21st-century women opera singers
Musicians from Vilnius